The Palace of Coudenberg was a royal residence situated on the Coudenberg or Koudenberg (Dutch for "Cold Hill"), a small hill in what is today the Royal Quarter of Brussels, Belgium.

For nearly 700 years, the Castle and then Palace of Coudenberg was the residence (and seat of power) of the counts, dukes, archdukes, kings, emperors or governors who, from the 12th century to the 18th century, exerted their sovereignty over the Duchy of Brabant and later over all or part of the Burgundian and then Spanish and Austrian Netherlands.

The palace was completely destroyed in an accidental fire which broke out on the night of 3 February 1731. Only the underground parts remain today. After several years of recent excavations, the archaeological vestiges of the palace and its foundations are open to the public.

History

Early history
The exact date when the first castle of Coudenberg was built remains a subject of debate. It is generally fixed to the middle of the 11th century, when the counts of Leuven and Brussels left the bottom of the valley of the river Senne and built their castle on the heights of the Coudenberg, where there was a smaller risk of floods, and from where they could dominate Brussels. The choice of this site was also undoubtedly explained by its strategic position near urbanised areas, the road leading to Leuven where their main residence was located, as well as the Sonian Forest, an important reserve for game and raw materials. In 1047, the transfer by Count Lambert II of Leuven of the relics of the martyr Saint Gudula from Saint Gaugericus' chapel to the church that would later become the Cathedral of St. Michael and St. Gudula, probably corresponded to the displacement of the seat of county power from the lower to the upper town. Still, the existence of the castle is well attested in the 12th century.

With the creation of the Duchy of Brabant in 1183 by the Holy Roman Emperor Frederick Barbarossa, the Coudenberg gained in importance and was included within the first great wall built around the city. The hunting park of the dukes led down the hill to the north, a remnant of which is now Brussels Park.

Rise in importance
When at the start of the 13th century, the Duke of Brabant preferred Brussels to Leuven, the Coudenberg castle became the seat of the court. With the construction of the city's second wall, following the 1356 occupation by Count Louis II of Flanders, the castle was no longer necessary as a primary defence, and it was gradually converted from a military strong point into a residential palace to fit its new prestigious role. From that time on, links were woven between the ducal house and the city, which took charge of some embellishment works for the palace which has become by then the dukes' principal seat of government and a leisure home.

The first regular meetings of the States-General, composed of delegates from the middle class, clergy and nobility of the Burgundian Netherlands, were held there in 1465. It was in this room that in 1515 Duchess Margaret of Austria formally relinquished her regency over the Low Countries to Charles von Habsburg, and the future emperor Charles V became the Duke of Burgundy. It was also in this same room that, 40 years later, Charles V abdicated in favour of his son, King Philip II of Spain. During his reign, Charles V ordered the creation of a large market square, known as the /, in front of the palace. In the palace itself, he instructed the building of galleries and rooms in Renaissance style and the construction of the Grand Chapel in late Gothic style, in memory of his parents, Philip the Handsome and Joanna of Castile.

In the 17th century, under their reign as the sovereigns of the Spanish Netherlands, the Archdukes Albert VII and Isabella established their court on the Coudenberg. The archdukes restored the facade of the palace, transformed the buildings and refitted the apartments and gardens. As art lovers, the archdukes brought to their court the best artists of the time, Jan Brueghel and Rubens among them, to decorate the palace with their works.

Fire and destruction
This impressive complex suffered several fires over the centuries. In 1679, a fire destroyed part of the roof. On the night of 3 February 1731, a fire broke out in the kitchens and quickly engulfed the entire palace. The freezing conditions made it difficult to deliver any water and the means of firefighting were very insufficient. In the morning, the palace was in ruins with many of the works of art destroyed along with the governmental archives.

After the fire, the court moved to the Palace of Orange-Nassau, on the site of today's Palace of Charles of Lorraine, which from then on was known as the "New Court". Several projects for the redevelopment of this space were proposed, including the reconstruction of a palace, which did not go beyond the stage of sketches, for lack of money. In 1769, the idea germinated to clear and level the ruins of the Place des Bailles and to convert it into an esplanade intended for military parades. The plan was on the verge of completion in 1772, when another project rendered it obsolete.

It was only in 1774 that Prince Charles Alexander of Lorraine, Governor of the Austrian Netherlands, proposed replacing the ruins with a monumental royal square inspired by French models such as the Place Stanislas in Nancy (1755) and the Place Royale in Reims (1759), of which it is almost an exact replica. The project was approved that same year by Empress Maria Theresa of Austria, who authorised the demolition. The first draft of the project, designed by the engineers-architects Louis-Joseph Baudour and  had planned to keep the Gothic chapel of the former palace, which had been spared by the fire. Due to the architectural clash with the surrounding neoclassical buildings, however, it was pulled down.

Present day

Nowadays, on the Coudenberg, just off the south-western corner of Brussels Park, lies the Place Royale/Koningsplein, the neoclassical square built between 1775 and 1782 atop the ruins of the old palace. At the centre of the square is an equestrian statue of Godfrey of Bouillon, the leader of the first crusade in 1096. This square is also faced by the neoclassical Church of St. James on Coudenberg, which was designed by the architects Gilles-Barnabé Guimard and Louis Montoyer and built from 1776 to 1787. In the 19th century, a dome and bell tower, as well as a coloured fresco, were added to the church.

Around the Place Royale, one can find many cultural institutions of Brussels; the BELvue Museum, the Royal Museums of Fine Arts of Belgium, the Musical Instruments Museum (MIM) (the entrance of which is through the Old England building), and the Magritte Museum. There are a number of other notable buildings on the Coudenberg including the Court of Audit of Belgium; the Royal Chapel, built in 1760–61 with a Louis XVI-style interior; the Palace of Charles of Lorraine; and the Royal Museums of Fine Arts of Belgium. Other major tourist attractions are located within walking distance; Brussels Park, the Royal Palace, and the Cathedral of St. Michael and St. Gudula.

Archaeological remains and partial restoration
The remains of the ancient palace and adjacent building have been extensively excavated below present ground level, and preserved with a partial concrete cover. The remains can be visited via the BELvue Museum, and provide an excellent presentation of this historical site. The main buildings of the palace stood on roughly the same location as the present-day museum and the Rue Royale/Koningstraat which faces it. The adjacent chapel and  buildings stood on sites which are now respectively part of the Centre for Fine Arts (BOZAR/PSK centre) and the north corner of the Place Royale/Koningsplein beside the Musical Instruments Museum (MIM). The former / ran beside these buildings; it had a significant slope, but the present surface of the Rue Royale, which parallels it, is flat, as the whole area was levelled in the 18th century. The lower rooms of these buildings partially survived the fire, and are exposed in the archaeological site.

On the other side of the Rue Isabelle, all along its length lay the house of the influential Counts of Hoogstraeten, currently at an advanced stage of excavation, with a view to later opening to visitors, alongside the existing remains.

See also
 List of castles and châteaux in Belgium
 History of Brussels

References

General note
 This article is based in part on material from the French Wikipedia.

Notes

Bibliography

External links

 The Former Palace of Brussels – The Archaeological Site of Coudenberg

Palaces in Brussels
Tourist attractions in Brussels
Archaeological sites in Belgium
Royal residences in Belgium
Burned buildings and structures
Demolished buildings and structures in Belgium
Former buildings and structures in Belgium
City of Brussels
History of Brussels
11th-century establishments in Belgium
Buildings and structures completed in the 17th century
Buildings and structures demolished in 1731